Aproaerema mercedella is a moth of the family Gelechiidae. It is found on the Canary Islands.

The wingspan is about 10 mm. The forewings are blackish, with pale yellow patches and lines. The hindwings are leaden grey.

References

Moths described in 1908
Aproaerema
Moths of Africa